Events in the year 2006 in Monaco.

Incumbents 
 Monarch: Albert II
 State Minister: Jean-Paul Proust

Events 

 February – The Sovereign Prince is seen being a spectator at the Opening Ceremony of the 2006 Winter Olympics, with a woman the media quickly identifies as South African, Olympic-class swimmer Charlene Wittstock, his future wife.
 May - Grand Prix Monaco Formula 1 held on 28th May 2006 at Circuit de Monaco. The winner was the Spanish driver Fernando Alonso racing with Renault.
 June – The Sovereign Prince officially acknowledged his paternity of Jazmin Grace Grimaldi, a 14-year-old girl living in California with her mother, Tamara Rotolo. Prince Albert also acknowledged his relationship with Charlene Wittstock; the Palace and media had begun to refer to as his "companion," with some in the press picking up the idea of "official companion."
 September - Monaco Yacht Show was held in Port Hercules from the 20th to the 23rd of September; in total 95 boats represented boat builders, shipyards and yacht brokers. It was evident that it's was a Superyacht convention as the participant yachts reached up to 88 meters long, with the sailing yacht 'The Maltese Falcon'.

Deaths

See also 

 2006 in Europe
 City states

References 

 
Years of the 21st century in Monaco
2000s in Monaco
Monaco
Monaco